Eupithecia rosai is a moth in the family Geometridae. It is found on the Canary Islands.

The wingspan is 15–18 mm.

References

Moths described in 1962
rosai
Moths of Africa